Prevention Science is a peer-reviewed public health journal covering prevention science.

Background
It was established in 2000 and is published eight times per year by Springer Science+Business Media on behalf of the Society for Prevention Research, of which it is the official journal. The editor-in-chief is Catherine Bradshaw (University of Virginia). According to the Journal Citation Reports, the journal has a 2017 impact factor of 2.594, ranking it 25th out of 156 journals in the category "Public, Environmental & Occupational Health".

References

External links

Preventive medicine journals
Public health journals
Publications established in 2000
Springer Science+Business Media academic journals
English-language journals
8 times per year journals